Alex Tait (born 18 March 1988) is a rugby union player for Newcastle Falcons in the English Premiership.

Rugby career

Tait's usual position is fullback, but he can also cover at centre. He made his first team début for Newcastle against Cetransa El Salvador in November 2007.

After making his first team debut in 2007, Tait became a regular for the Falcons in his decade at the club. Appearing over 200 times by the close of the 2017-2018 English Rugby Premiership season. "He has turned in extremely consistent performances which are right up there at the top," said director of rugby Dean Richards at the time. Acknowledging the hard grafting full-back's service to the Falcons.

2017-18 saw Tait scoring the Newcastle Falcons first and last tries of the campaign at home against Worcester and away to Exeter. Making 23 first team appearances, contributing to the Falcons' best season in 20 years. 
 Tait signed a new contract with the Falcons from late 2017 onward.

Taits so called mentors include Terry Toyne, Gary Bishop and Peter Fry.

References

External links
Newcastle profile
England profile
stats

1988 births
Living people
English rugby union players
Newcastle Falcons players
People educated at Barnard Castle School
Rugby union players from Shotley Bridge
Rugby union centres